Malva nicaeensis is a species of flowering plant in the mallow family known by the common names bull mallow and French mallow.

Description
Malva nicaeensis is an annual or biennial herb producing a hairy, upright stem up to 60 centimeters long. The leaves are up to 12 centimeters wide and have several slight lobes along the edges.

Flowers appear in the leaf axils, each with pinkish to light purple petals around a centimeter long. The disc-shaped fruit has several segments.

Plant uses and properties 
In the Levant, mallows grow profusely after the first winter rains. The leaves and stems are edible, and are widely collected by indigenous peoples for food, as they make an excellent garnish when chopped and fried in olive-oil with onions and spices. In Israel, the plant is renowned for having fed the besieged Jewish population in the 1948 Battle for Jerusalem, its use similar to spinach. A particularly famous preparation are the Khubeza patties. Apicius, a collection of Roman cookery recipes, mentions garum being used as a fish stock to flavor cooked mallows.

References

External links
 
 Jepson Manual Treatment
 
 
 

nicee
Flora of North Africa
Flora of Western Asia
Taxa named by Carlo Allioni
Flora of Malta